Touchpress was an acclaimed app developer and publisher based in Central London. The company specialised in creating in-depth premium apps on educational subjects including the Periodic Table, Beethoven, the Solar System, T.S. Eliot, Shakespeare, and others. Their app "Barefoot World Atlas" was named one of the top 10 apps of all time by Apple. Of Touchpress' "Disney Animated," which was named the best iPad app of 2013 worldwide by Apple, iTunes' App Editor noted, "We’re absolutely spellbound."

In October 2016, Touchpress sold its portfolio of science and literature apps to a new, venture-capital backed publisher in the educational content market, Touch Press Inc., to concentrate on digital tools and services for cultural organisations to grow audience engagement, with an emphasis on video. As part of this new strategy, the company has rebranded to "Amphio".'

Origins 
Touchpress was founded by Theodore Gray, Max Whitby, John Cromie, Stephen Wolfram and others shortly after the announcement of the launch of the iPad. The first published app was "The Elements," a continuation of the founders' work together on a coffee table book about the periodic table, which they followed up in 2014 with  "Molecules", allowing users to touch and discover the basic building blocks of the world.

Design philosophy 
Touchpress creates "living books." Their apps feature many interactive elements and seek to engage readers with a deeper understanding of the subject. The company is part of a broad movement to re-define books and the reading experience for the 21st century. Touchpress is particularly notable for their partnerships both within and outside the publishing industry. To date, the company has worked with Juilliard, Disney, Deutsche Grammophon, Faber and Faber, Seamus Heaney, Björk, Fiona Shaw, Patrick Stewart, Steve Reich, Stephen Fry, Andrew Motion, Stephen Hough, Esa-Pekka Salonen and the Philharmonia Orchestra, National Geographic, and more.

Apps published by Touchpress
 2010  "The Elements"
 2011  "X is for X-Ray"
 2011  "Skulls by Simon Winchester"
 2011  "Gems and Jewels"
 2011  "The Waste Land"
 2012  "March of the Dinosaurs"
 2012  "Solar System"
 2012  "Leonardo da Vinci: Anatomy"
 2012  "The Sonnets by William Shakespeare"
 2012  "The Pyramids"
 2012  "War Horse"
 2012  "The Orchestra"
 2012  "Barefoot World Atlas"
 2013  "Beethoven's 9th Symphony"
 2013  "The Liszt Sonata"
 2013  "Disney Animated"
 2013  "The Elements in Action"
 2013  "Journeys Of Invention"
 2014  "Incredible Numbers by Professor Ian Stewart"
 2014  "Vivaldi's Four Seasons"
 2014  "Seamus Heaney: Five Fables"
 2014  "The Elements Flashcards" 
 2014  "Collins Bird Guide"
 2014  "Apprentice Architect"
 2014  "Think Like Churchill"
 2014  "False Conviction"
 2014  "Molecules"
 2015 "Juilliard Open Studios"
 2015 "Juilliard String Quartet"
 2015 "Steve Reich's Clapping Music"
 2015 "Arcadia by Iain Pears"
 2015 "Baron Ferdinand's Challenge"
 2015 "Classical Music Reimagined"
 2016 "Millie Marotta’s Colouring Adventures"
 2016 "The Henle Library"

References

External links 
Official website

Book publishing companies of the United Kingdom
Software companies based in London